RP, R-P, Rp, R-p, or rp may refer to:

Businesses and organizations 
 Rainforest Partnership, an environmental organization based in Austin, Texas
 RallyPoint, a social network for the US military
 Reform Party (Singapore), an opposition party in Singapore led by Kenneth Jeyaretnam
 Republic Polytechnic, a polytechnic in Singapore
 Rheinische Post, a German newspaper
 Rhône-Poulenc, a former French chemical company
 Royal Society of Portrait Painters (London), with membership indicated RP
 Roma Party (Romska partija), a political party in Serbia
 Welfare Party, or Refah Partisi, in Turkey
 Chautauqua Airlines (IATA airline designator RP)
 Registered Plumber, in UK

Economics and finance 
Repurchase agreement, the sale of securities together with an agreement for the seller to buy back the securities at a later date
Reservation price, the highest price a buyer is willing to pay for goods or a service
Rupee, common name for the currencies of several countries
Rupiah, the official currency of Indonesia

Language 
 Received Pronunciation, a standard accent of Standard English in the United Kingdom
 Rioplatense Spanish, a dialect spoken in parts of Argentina and Uruguay

Places 
 Republic of the Philippines (former two-letter country code)
 Republic of Poland (Rzeczpospolita Polska)
 Rhineland-Palatinate, one of sixteen German states
 Région Parisienne or Île-de-France, the area surrounding Paris, France

Religion 
 Reformed Presbyterian Church (disambiguation)
 Regulative principle of worship,  a Calvinist and Anabaptist principle
 Religious Programs Specialist
 Retribution principle (RP)

Science, technology, and mathematics

Biology and medicine
 Radical prostatectomy
 Raynaud's phenomenon
 Retinitis pigmentosa
 Medical prescription from Latin, also Rp/.

Mathematics
 RP (complexity), randomized polynomial time, a class in computational complexity theory
 Ranked Pairs, a Condorcet voting method
 Real projective line
 Real projective plane
 Real projective space

Other uses in science and technology
 Rapid prototyping, a manufacturing and engineering process
 Rear projection effect, a film technique
 Red phosphorus, an allotrope of the element
Rendezvous Point in Protocol Independent Multicast, a collection of network layer multicast routing protocols
 Reversed-phase chromatography, a laboratory technique
Route Processor, a general-purpose CPU in some Cisco routers
RP, a small rock climbing nut, named after Roland Pauligk
RP-1, a rocket propellant
 RP-3, a British rocket projectile in World War II

Other uses 
 Relief pitcher, a baseball term
 Registered Paralegal, a certification program of the National Federation of Paralegal Associations
 Riot Points (used in League of Legends)
 Regimental Police or Regimental Provost, soldiers responsible for regimental discipline and unit custody in the British Army
 Reporting Person or Party, in U.S. law enforcement jargon
 Registered Psychotherapist within Ontario
Role-playing
Rating Pending, a rating used by ESRB in promotional games that has lacked a rating.